Alim Gadanov (born 20 October 1983) is a Russian judoka.

Achievements

External links

 
 
 

1983 births
Living people
Russian male judoka
Judoka at the 2008 Summer Olympics
Olympic judoka of Russia
21st-century Russian people